In Stone v. Graham, 449 U.S. 39 (1980), the Supreme Court of the United States ruled that a Kentucky statute was unconstitutional and in violation of the Establishment Clause of the First Amendment, because it lacked a nonreligious,  legislative purpose. The statute required the posting of a copy of the Ten Commandments on the wall of each public classroom in the state. The copies of the Ten Commandments were purchased with private funding, but the Court ruled that because they were being placed in public classrooms they were in violation of the First Amendment.

Opinion of the Court

The Court held that the Kentucky statute that required the Ten Commandments to be posted in school classrooms violated the First Amendment. To interpret the First Amendment, the Court used the precedent established in Lemon v. Kurtzman and the three-part "Lemon test". The Court concluded that because "requiring the posting of the Ten Commandments in public school rooms has no secular legislative purpose," it is unconstitutional.

The Court approached the case through the lens created in Lemon v. Kurtzman. It agreed that if Kentucky's statute broke any of the three guidelines outlined in the Lemon test, the statute would violate the Establishment Clause. The majority held that The Commandments convey a religious undertone, because they concern "the religious duties of believers: worshipping the Lord God alone, avoiding idolatry, not using the Lord's name in vain, and observing the Sabbath Day." But since "the Commandments are [not] integrated into the school curriculum, where the Bible may constitutionally be used in an appropriate study of history," they have no secular purpose and a definite religious purpose.

The Court concluded that even though The Commandments were paid for by a private institution and were "merely posted on the wall ... the mere posting of the copies under the auspices of the legislature provides the 'official support of the State ... Government' that the Establishment Clause prohibits."  Even though the Commandments were not used to indoctrinate or convert students but were quite passive, the Court maintained, "it is no defense to urge that the religious practices here may be relatively minor encroachments on the First Amendment."  Because it endorsed religion and had no secular purpose, the Court concluded that the Kentucky statute was unconstitutional. 

Majority:
"This is not a case in which the Ten Commandments are integrated into the school curriculum, where the Bible may constitutionally be used in an appropriate study of history, civilization, ethics, comparative religion, or the like. [See Abington School District v. Schempp.] Posting of religious texts on the wall serves no such educational function. If the posted copies of the Ten Commandments are to have any effect at all, it will be to induce the schoolchildren to read, meditate upon, perhaps to venerate and obey, the Commandments. However desirable this might be as a matter of private devotion, it is not a permissible state objective under the Establishment Clause of the Constitution."

Dissent

Justice Rehnquist argued in his dissent that the statute did not violate the First Amendment because there was a legitimate secular purpose to the Ten Commandments' posting. He wrote, "the Ten Commandments have had a significant impact on the development of secular legal codes of the Western World," which he qualified as a secular purpose. Rehnquist's dissent also argued that something's relation to religion does not automatically cause it to "respect an establishment of religion."

Rehnquist agreed with the framework proposed by the majority, but thought the Kentucky statute had a secular purpose. That "the asserted secular purpose may overlap with what some may see as a religious objective does not render it unconstitutional", he wrote. The Court argued that since the Commandments are a "sacred text" and not taught in the context of history classes, their mandatory posting is unconstitutional. Rehnquist argued that the Commandments "had a significant impact on the development of secular legal codes of the Western World." His dissent contended that since religion has "been closely identified with our history and government … one can hardly respect the system of education that would leave the student wholly ignorant of the currents of religious thought."

See also
 List of United States Supreme Court cases, volume 449
 Glassroth v. Moore (11th Cir. 2003)
 Van Orden v. Perry (2005)
 McCreary County v. American Civil Liberties Union (2005)
 Pleasant Grove City v. Summum (2009)
 Green v. Haskell County Board of Commissioners (10th Cir. 2009)

External links
 
 

United States Supreme Court cases
United States Supreme Court cases of the Burger Court
Establishment Clause case law
1980 in United States case law
Legal history of Kentucky
1980 in Kentucky
1980 in religion
Ten Commandments